The 2015–16 season was FC Twente's 50th season in the Eredivisie.

Squad

Last updated: 2 April 2016

Transfers

Summer

Winter

Non-competitive

Friendlies

Last updated: 27 January 2016

Competitions

Eredivisie

League table

League matches

Last updated: 8 May 2016

KNVB Cup

Last updated: 24 September 2015

Statistics

Appearances and goals

|-

|-
|colspan="10"|Players who left the club during the 2015–16 season
|-

|}

Goalscorers

References

FC Twente seasons
Twente